Qeshlaq-e Akhmud-e Olya (also romanized as Qeshlāq-e Akhmūd-e ‘Olyā) is a village in Qeshlaq Rural District, Abish Ahmad District, Kaleybar County, East Azerbaijan Province, Iran. At the 2006 census, its population was 26, in 7 families.

References 

Populated places in Kaleybar County